Chi Pegasi, Latinised from χ Pegasi, is a single star in the northern constellation of Pegasus, along the eastern constellation border with Pisces. It has a reddish hue and is faintly visible to the naked eye with an apparent visual magnitude of 4.80. The distance to this star is approximately 368 light-years based on parallax, but it is drifting closer with a radial velocity of −46 km/s.

This is an aging red giant star on the asymptotic giant branch with a stellar classification of M2+III. It is about 8 billion years old with a mass 6% greater than the Sun's. With the supply of hydrogen at its core exhausted, the star has cooled and expanded to 53 times the girth of the Sun.

Chi Pegasi is a suspected small-amplitude variable. Koen and Eyer examined the Hipparcos data for Chi Pegasi, and found that its brightness varied by 0.0094 magnitudes, with a period of 5.9641 days.

References

External links

M-type giants
Suspected variables
Asymptotic-giant-branch stars

Pegasus (constellation)
Pegasi, Chi
BD+19 27
Pegasi, 89
001013
001168
0045